Thurso East (alternatively, the North Shore) is a coastline section of the Atlantic  east of Thurso, Caithness, northern Scotland. It is situated at the mouth of the River Thurso, overlooked by the remains of Thurso Castle. The reef is made of layers of Caithness flagstone (the same stone that paves the Strand and much of Paris). It is Scotland's prime surfing venue on the north coast.

Surfing
Thurso East is a fast reef break and has hosted many international competitions. Thurso East came into the spotlight in 2006 when it was used to host the inaugural O'Neill Highland Open WQS surfing competition. The event was won by British surfer Russell Winter. From 2006 to 2011 O’Neill sponsored an international surf contest at this location which was latterly called the Coldwater Classic and the event regularly attracted big name surfers. In 2012 O'Neill announced that it wouldn't be renewing their sponsorship deal, in order to direct resources elsewhere.

See also 
 Thurso Flagstone

References

See also
Glossary of surfing

Caithness
Surfing locations in Scotland
Scottish coast
Thurso